Suzemsky District is an administrative and municipal district (raion), one of the twenty-seven in Bryansk Oblast, Russia. It is located in the southeast of the oblast. Its administrative center is the urban locality (a work settlement) of Suzemka. Population:   19,513 (2002 Census);  The population of Suzemka accounts for 56.9% of the district's total population.

References

Sources

Districts of Bryansk Oblast